William Waldegrave may refer to:

 Sir William Waldegrave (Suffolk MP, died 1554), MP for Suffolk, 1545
 Sir William Waldegrave (Suffolk MP, died 1613) (c.1540–1613), MP for Suffolk, 1563
 William Waldegrave, 1st Baron Radstock (1753–1825), Royal Navy admiral and Governor of Newfoundland
 William Waldegrave, 8th Earl Waldegrave (1788–1859), Royal Navy vice-admiral
 William Waldegrave, Viscount Chewton (1816–1854), British Army officer, son of the above
 William Waldegrave, 9th Earl Waldegrave (1851–1930), British politician, son of the above
 William Waldegrave, 10th Earl Waldegrave (1882–1933), British peer, son of the above
 William Waldegrave, Baron Waldegrave of North Hill (born 1946), British politician